Aghwan may be,

Aghwan language
Aghwan Dorjieff